Romain Achilli (born 15 February 1993) is a French footballer who plays as a forward for Gallia Club Lucciana.

Club career
A former striker, Achilli gained his first call-up to the first-team of his hometown club Bastia in March 2013 against Bordeaux. He then made his competitive debut a few months later, in a Coupe de la Ligue match against Evian TG in December 2013, starting as a left-back. He debuted in Ligue 1 on 1 March 2014, in an away match against FC Lorient.

In January 2016, Achilli signed for FC Dieppe.

In August 2017, Achilli returned to former club SC Bastia as one of four new signings announced by the club, which had played in Ligue 1 in the 2016–17 season but dropped to the fifth-tier Championnat National 3 after filing bankruptcy.

References

External links
 
 

1993 births
Living people
French footballers
Association football midfielders
Ligue 1 players
SC Bastia players
Corsica international footballers
Footballers from Corsica